Coyah is a town and sub-prefecture located in western Guinea. It is the capital of Coyah Prefecture. 
Its population is 77,103 (2008 est).

Notable people
Karim Bangoura (c.1926-1972), diplomat
Achkar Marof (1930-1971), diplomat
Kabèlè Abdoul Camara (1950-), diplomat

References

Sub-prefectures of the Kindia Region